Sonny King (born 1940 in Sydney, Australia) is an Australian artist. He was nominated for a sports Emmy in 1982. King is the son of former circus owner Mervyn King, which was the impetus behind his exhibition "The Original Silver's Circus & Zoo".

References

External links
 The Circus is Coming to Town

1940 births
Australian artists
Living people